The United Party of Canada was a federally registered political party in Canada founded in November 2009. Its key principles were fiscal responsibility, social progressivism, and environmental sustainability. The party was formed by former members of various other political parties. The party was deregistered by Elections Canada on August 31, 2016.

Policies 
The three key principles as stated above were divided further into six unifying themes that represented the party core platform that included:
 Education: According to the party's website, it believed in universal education at the undergraduate university, college or trade school level.
 Environment: The party recognized the need for renewable energy resources, specifically the construction of a renewable energy infrastructure that is fiscally responsible.
 Economy: The party believed that there are opportunities for economic growth by engaging with Canada's partners in the Commonwealth and the Francophonie to extend trading and investment for both sides.
 Animal rights: On the subject of animal rights, the party promised to enact legislation with serious criminal penalties for those who do not respect wild and domesticated animals.
 Children's rights: The party's policy for children involved legislating and enforcing laws against child abuse, and making sure that children in foster care are raised well and children with special needs will not be separated from their parents.
 Unity: The party was dedicated to unifying all geographical and racial demographics of Canada in an attempt to make everyone work together towards a common goal.

Ideology 
The party described itself on its website as centrist without any direct specific ideological affiliation other than occupying the centre of the political spectrum.

Election results

Leaders 
 Brian Jedan (2010–2011)
 Robert 'Bob' Kesic (2011–2016)

Charges by the Commissioner of Canada Elections 
On April 23, 2018, former party president Robert Cameron pleaded guilty to a charge of having on behalf of the United Party provided the chief electoral officer with "misleading or false information" between June 21 and 27, 2016, in regard to the parties submission of the required list of 250 electors as being party members.

External links 
  — archived version of the party website, used from 2009–2016

References 

Federal political parties in Canada
Defunct political parties in Canada